Undōkōenmae Station may refer to:
 Undōkōenmae Station (Aomori), a train station in Aomori Prefecture, Japan
 Undōkōenmae Station (Aichi), a tram stop in Aichi Prefecture, Japan